In organic chemistry, the Lombardo methylenation is a name reaction that allows for the methylenation of carbonyl compounds with the use of Lombardo's reagent, which is a mix of zinc, dibromomethane, and titanium tetrachloride.

Applications
The Lombardo methylenation has been used in the total synthesis of tetrodotoxin and hirustene.

References

Name reactions